is a tower defense role-playing game developed and published by Sega for iOS, Android, and PlayStation Vita. It was released in Japan on July 26, 2013, for iOS, August 1, 2013, for Android and on July 16, 2014, for the PlayStation Vita. The game is licensed in Asia by SNDA in China, MobiMon for both Taiwan and Macau, Actoz Soft for South Korea and gumi Asia for both Southeast Asia and North American release, however the game was closed down in North America & Southeast Asia on February 29, 2016.

The series spawned an original video animation series directed by Takeshi Mori, animated by Jūmonji. It was released on December 18, 2014. An anime film trilogy titled Chain Chronicle: The Light of Haecceitas premiered in Japanese Theaters between December 3, 2016, and February 11, 2017. An anime television series adaptation compiling the film trilogy was aired on January 8, 2017.

Gameplay
Chain Chronicle combines three gameplay elements: tower defense, traditional role-playing and card trading in the form of Arcanas. The role-playing game elements drive the entire story, allowing the player to make decisions, visit towns and participate in events. The map system shows the towns and areas that the player must visit by tapping on one town to another, however for the player to get to the next town, it must clear some enemies first. Battle in the game is similar to a traditional tower defense game, each player can command a team of four Arcanas, with two more as sub-party extras and a guest unit. Each Arcana is assigned to 5 classes, and each unit are weak to specific class. In the second versions of the game, updates introduced Fighters and Gunners, with the former being a type of Swordsman, and the latter being an archer-type.

The goal of the game is to clear each stage without the enemy reaching the player's safe zone. Tapping one unit into the enemy allows it to attack and if the stage is cleared, the player can move to the next stage until it reaches the boss. If the one of the enemies reaches the safe zone, the game is over. However, each unit has its own skill that can counter against enemies and easily clear each stage. If all stages are cleared, the player is awarded with money, special arcana and Arcana Coins. Players can also summon allies by using either Prysma or Arcana Coins, which are earned during gameplay. Each unit has its own story, which can be completed to obtain more Prysma or to unlock its special skill. Events are also in the game, allowing players to get special items and Arcanas.

Story
Led by the Holy King, the continent was at peace until one day, a mysterious group called the  appeared and started conquering the land. In response, the Holy King and its troops fought against it, but Holy Capital fell and the Holy King was killed by the mysterious Black King. As the continent was in the glimpse of destruction, hope glimmered as one man decided to fight back and formed the Volunteer Army to oppose the Black King and bring peace back to Yggdra.

Characters

Volunteer Army

A Warrior-Class Swordsman and Leader of the Volunteer Army, he is guided by the sprite Pirika in order to protect Phoena from the Black Army as well as discovering the mysteries behind the book she's carrying. He is illustrated by toi8.

A Chronicler-Class Cleric and the main heroine of the story. Phoena is a mysterious girl who carries the Chronicle, a mysterious book that holds the world's history. She has retrograde amnesia; she cannot remember who she really is when she is first attacked by the Black Army until Yuri saved her. Over time, she begins to trust Yuri and the others as she tries to discover the mysteries behind the book. At the end of the first story, she is revealed to be the daughter of the Black King. She is illustrated by toi8.

A unique Elf Sprite who guides both Yuri and Phoena in their quests, she first saved Yuri once when he was chosen to form the Volunteer Army. She is illustrated by toi8.

One of the first few members of the Volunteer Army, he is once a simple farmer before joining the Volunteer Army as a Knight to protect the kingdom. Though his skills are not as sharp, he greatly improves as his shield becomes the defining point of each battles. He is illustrated by RyuToru.

Also one of the first few members of the Volunteer Army, she is a former member of the Ranger's Guild before she left and joined Yuri. She doesn't show harsh emotions and is very nice, but sometimes she makes rational decisions. She is illustrated by moc.

The last of the three guaranteed members of the Volunteer Army, she is a Cleric who's part of the Guild Alliance. Despite being serious and forthright, she had no sense of humor, and is also very clumsy. But also excels in healing skills. She is illustrated by Tetsu Kurosawa.

The main character of The Light of Haecceitas Anime, he is a thief who became involved in the battle between the Volunteer Army and the Black Army.

Black Army

 he is 16 years old.

Holy Kingdom

Nine Territories

Lord of the First Territory, the largest of all the nine territories. Not satisfied with only the Nine Territories of Fire, he aims to take over the entirety of Yggdra by will of nature.

Media

Video game
The game was first released on iOS on July 26, 2013, following an Android release on August 1, 2013. A PlayStation Vita port titled  was released on July 16, 2014, on both Physical form and in the PlayStation Store.

The global version of the game was released on December 8, 2014. The second version of the game, Chain Chronicle: Brave New Continent, was released on October 6, 2015. Following with a Climax Chapter in December 2015. A Sequel chapter, only titled  is released on November 24, 2016.

The global version of the game was shut down on February 29, 2016.

Manga
A manga adaptation titled  was written and illustrated by Junpei Okazaki, serialized in Kodansha's Bessatsu Shōnen Magazine from July 2014 to August 2015. 3 tankōbon volumes are released with the first volume containing a special code to obtain Caz in the game, who is voiced by Daisuke Namikawa.

Anime
An original video animation was produced by both Jūmonji and Sotsu and released on September 6, 2014, for theatrical screening and on December 18, 2014, on DVD. The opening song is titled "REASON"  while the ending is titled "Arrive", both performed by The Sketchbook.

A film trilogy titled  was released in Japan, with the first, second and third films premiering on December 3, 2016, January 14, 2017, and February 11, 2017, respectively. The anime television version begin airing in January 2017 after the release of the first anime film. The opening theme for the movie version is titled "Chain the World" by Nao Tōyama while the ending song is titled "PARAISO" by Nano. For the TV broadcast, the opening theme is titled "MY LIBERATION" by Nano while the ending theme is titled "True Destiny" by Nao Tōyama. Crunchyroll has licensed the series in North America.

Episode list

Reception
The game was met with positive reviews upon its first month of launch. Gamezebo praised its grid-based combat mechanics, number of characters, and extensive story, but criticized the serialized female character designs, saying "...the portrayal of women in Chain Chronicle is completely, and frustratingly, stuck in the past." Despite that, Gamezebo concluded "[e]ven though it has a few blemishes, they don’t stop the gameplay from being fun and rewarding". 148Apps praised the game for its gameplay and fair free-to-play system, stated that "Chain Chronicle is an easy-to-learn role-playing game that successfully combines tower defense, strategy, and action".

Note

References

External links
  
 
  of the TV Anime: Chain Chronicle ~Light of Haecceitas~ 

2017 anime television series debuts
2013 video games
2014 anime OVAs
2015 comics endings
Android (operating system) games
Anime television series based on video games
Crunchyroll anime
Funimation
Graphinica
IOS games
Japanese role-playing video games
Kodansha manga
Manga based on video games
Muse Communication
PlayStation Vita games
Role-playing video games
Sega video games
Shōnen manga
Single-player video games
TMS Entertainment
Video games developed in Japan